Magdalena Dávalos y Maldonado (1725-1806) was an Ecuadorian scholar and literary figure. She was famous for her education, academic knowledge and literary talents in contemporary Ecuador, and was the only female member of the famous literary society Escuela de la Concordia.

See also
 María Estefanía Dávalos y Maldonado

References
 Ortiz Arellano, Carlos. Cien figuras de Chimborazo, Casa de la Cultura Núcleo de Chimborazo.

19th-century Ecuadorian people
1725 births
1806 deaths
People from Chambo
19th-century Ecuadorian writers
19th-century Ecuadorian women
19th-century Ecuadorian women writers
18th-century women writers